The World Group is the highest level of Davis Cup competition in 2018. The first-round losers will play in the Davis Cup World Group Play-offs.

Participating teams

Seeds

Draw

First round

France vs. Netherlands

Japan vs. Italy

Spain vs. Great Britain

Australia vs. Germany

Kazakhstan vs. Switzerland

Croatia vs. Canada

Serbia vs. United States

Belgium vs. Hungary

Quarterfinals

Italy vs. France

Spain vs. Germany

Croatia vs. Kazakhstan

United States vs. Belgium

Semifinals

France vs. Spain

Croatia vs. United States

Final

France vs. Croatia

References

World Group